"This Corrosion" is a song by English rock band The Sisters of Mercy, released as the lead single from their second studio album, Floodland (1987), in September 1987. The song peaked at number 6 in Ireland, number 7 in the UK, and number 17 in Germany.

Composition 

"This Corrosion" was written by Andrew Eldritch and produced by Jim Steinman, and is one of the band's most well-known songs. It uses a 40-piece choir, and the LP version of the song lasts for nearly 11 minutes (the single versions are substantially shorter).

Eldritch's lyrics concern his previous band members leaving the Sisters of Mercy to form the Mission. The latter's lead singer, Wayne Hussey, was once a guitarist for the Sisters of Mercy. The lyrics of "This Corrosion" are a parody of Hussey's style.

Legacy 

The track was featured in the 2013 science-fiction comedy film, The World's End, with star Simon Pegg playing a 40-something who had been a "goth"/alternative rock fan in the 1980s as a youth who still styled himself on Eldritch. The song is heard twice in the film and in the film's closing credits. The 7" version/single edit (4:27) appears on the soundtrack to the film.

Track listing 

All songs written by Andrew Eldritch.

While none of the mixes have names, the 7", 12", CD and cassette versions of "This Corrosion" are all different. "Colours" is an edited version on the CD and cassette singles.

Charts

Cover versions 

The song has been covered by several artists, including:
 In Extremo (1999)
 Gerhard Potuznik (2002)
 Lambchop on the bonus disc for their 2002 album Is a Woman
 Godhead (2004)
 Unheilig (2004)
 Dkay.com (2004)
 Diane Birch (2010)
 Maryslim on their 2007 album A Perfect Mess with Jyrki 69 provided guest vocals.

Since 2012, some Sisters Of Mercy shows feature a guest appearance by Irish singer Lisa Cuthbert who performs her cover version of "This Corrosion" on piano.

Sampling 

The Hari Mata Hari's 1997 song "Ja nemam snage da te ne volim" and the Luna's 1998 song "Ne ostavljaj me" use the same intro, verse, chorus and bridge melody as the song "This Corrosion", but the pre-chorus melody in both songs is eliminated. The 2001 Most Precious Blood song "Shark Ethic" samples the song's introductory choir section in its opening and final breakdown.

References 

1987 songs
1987 singles
The Sisters of Mercy songs
Song recordings produced by Jim Steinman
Songs written by Andrew Eldritch
Song recordings with Wall of Sound arrangements